Clyde Donaldson (9 June 1894 – 23 May 1979) was an Australian rules footballer who played for Essendon in the Victorian Football League (VFL).

Family
The son of George Donaldson (1857-), and Louisa Emma Susanna Donaldson (1858-1932), née Seyler, Clyde Donaldson was born in Elsternwick, Victoria on 9 June 1894. His brother, Eric Donaldson played for St Kilda.

He married Edith Evelyn Happell (1895-1968) on 16 April 1921. He married Daisy Evans (1905-1981) on 24 September 1969.

Football

Essendon (VFL)
After two seasons playing with Essendon, Donaldson's career was interrupted by World War I when he spent fours years overseas with the Australian Expeditionary Force.

Training Units team (AIF)
While in London he took part in the famous "Pioneer Exhibition Game" of Australian Rules football, held in London, in October 1916, representing the Australian Training Units team. A news film was taken at the match.

Essendon (VFL)
In 1919 he returned to Essendon and became a regular Victorian interstate representative throughout the 1920s. A back pocket specialist, Donaldson was tough to beat in an aerial contest and was a long kick of the ball. He was a member of Essendon's 1923 and 1924 premiership teams.

Journalist
After retiring in 1926, Donaldson became a noted football journalist for the Truth newspaper.

Death
He died in East St Kilda on 23 May 1979.

See also
 1916 Pioneer Exhibition Game

Footnotes

References
 Photographs at The Sporting Globe, (Wednesday, 27 June 1923), p.1, and player at extreme right, back row, at :File:Essendon_fc_1923.jpg.
 Pioneer Exhibition Game Australian Football: in aid of British and French Red Cross Societies: 3rd Australian Division v. Australian Training Units at Queen's Club, West Kensington, on Saturday, October 28th, 1916, at 3pm, Wightman & Co., (London), 1919.
 Maplestone, M., Flying Higher: History of the Essendon Football Club 1872–1996, Essendon Football Club, (Melbourne), 1996. 
 Richardson, N. (2016) The Game of Their Lives, Pan Macmillan Australia: Sydney. 
 First World War Embarkation Roll: Private Clyde Donaldson (251), collection of the Australian War Memorial.
 First World War Nominal Roll: Private Clyde Donaldson (251), collection of the Australian War Memorial.
 First World War Service Record: Private Clyde Donaldson (251), National Archives of Australia.

External links

 
 
 Clyde Donaldson, at Boyles Football Photos.

1894 births
Australian rules footballers from Melbourne
Essendon Football Club players
Essendon Football Club Premiership players
Participants in "Pioneer Exhibition Game" (London, 28 October 1916)
Place of birth missing
1979 deaths
Two-time VFL/AFL Premiership players
People from Elsternwick, Victoria